The Central District of Qasr-e Qand County is a district (bakhsh) in Qasr-e Qand County, Sistan and Baluchestan province, Iran. At the 2006 census, its population was 19,994, in 3,368 families.  The district has one city: Qasr-e Qand. The district has one rural district (dehestan): Holunchekan Rural District.

References 

Qasr-e Qand County
Districts of Sistan and Baluchestan Province